William David Sutton (born 1944) is a former New Zealand politician of the Labour Party.

He represented the Hawkes Bay electorate in Parliament from 1984, when he defeated Richard Harrison, to 1990, when he was defeated by Michael Laws. His highest position was Chairman of Parliament's Finance and Expenditure Select Committee from 1988 to 1990.

He was subsequently elected a councillor on the Hawke's Bay Regional Council from 1992 to 1995.

He is a brother of former Labour MP and Cabinet Minister Jim Sutton. They were elected to Parliament each for the first time in 1984. Bill Sutton's then wife Jacque Aldridge gave birth to their second son David the night of the election.

Sutton has a PhD in biochemistry (Massey University) and worked as a research scientist from 1969 to 1984. After retiring from politics he worked as a senior policy analyst from 1996 to 2007.

He now lives in Napier and is a published poet. appearing in Takahe, Poetry New Zealand, Jaam, and other literary magazines. His second published poetry collection Billy Button - A Life (HB Poetry Press, 2016) included a brief autobiographical summary.

References

1944 births
Living people
New Zealand Labour Party MPs
Unsuccessful candidates in the 1990 New Zealand general election
Unsuccessful candidates in the 1981 New Zealand general election
Members of the New Zealand House of Representatives
New Zealand MPs for North Island electorates
Massey University alumni
New Zealand biochemists
New Zealand male poets
People from Napier, New Zealand